Ko Man Nok (also spelled Koh Munnork) is a small private island, among a group of islands in the Klaeng Bay, Rayong Province, Thailand, called Man. The group includes Ko Man Nai, Ko Man Klang and Ko Man Nok islands. Ko Man Nok has only one resort, Koh Munnork Resort.

Activities at the resort include kayaking, snorkeling and fishing.

References

Islands of Thailand
Islands of the Gulf of Thailand
Rayong province
Private islands of Asia